Ardmay is a settlement in Argyll and Bute, Scotland, on the shore of Loch Long.

References

Geography of Argyll and Bute